Nidularium rosulatum is a plant species in the genus Nidularium. This species is endemic to Brazil.

Cultivars
 Nidularium 'Rosalatum'

References

BSI Cultivar Registry Retrieved 11 October 2009

rosulatum
Flora of Brazil